Ebony Hoskin (born 23 March 2003) is an Australian cricketer who currently plays for New South Wales in the Women's National Cricket League (WNCL). She plays as a right-arm medium bowler.

Domestic career
Hoskin began training with New South Wales during the 2021–22 season, and played at that season's Under-19 National Championships. Ahead of the first match of the 2022–23 WNCL, an injury to Hannah Darlington allowed Hoskin to make her debut for New South Wales, against Queensland. Hoskin took a wicket with her first ball in state cricket, dismissing Georgia Redmayne, and overall took 3/39 from her 10 overs. She went on to play ten matches overall for the side that season, taking seven wickets at an average of 45.57.

References

External links

Ebony Hoskin at Cricket Australia

2003 births
Living people
Place of birth missing (living people)
Australian women cricketers
New South Wales Breakers cricketers